Kurup is an Indic surname. Notable people with this surname include:

Debbie Kurup (born 1979), English actress
Deepika Kurup (American inventor, scientist, and clean water advocate
 G. Shankara Kurup (1901–1978), Indian poet
 O. N. V. Kurup (1931–2016), Malayalam poet
 Palattu Koman (also known as Koma Kurup), a pioneer of the kalaripayattu Indian martial art form
 Guru Kunchu Kurup (1881–1970), Kathakali artiste
Helen Kurup, English actress, sister of Debbie
Joseph Kurup (born 1944), Malaysian politician
K. K. N. Kurup (born 1939), Indian historian 
K. Suresh Kurup (born 1956), member of the Legislative Assembly of Kerala
N. Peethambara Kurup, Indian politician
Neena Kurup, Indian actress
Pran Kurup (1966–2016), Indian entrepreneur and author
 Saiju Kurup , Malayalam film actor
Satheesh Kurup, Indian cinematographer
Shishir Kurup (born 1961), American actor
Shreeraj Kurup, Indian  poet and lyricist
Sooraj S. Kurup, Indian composer and film actor
Sukumara Kurup, Indian criminal
Vennikkulam Gopala Kurup (1902–1980), Indian poet, playwright, translator, lexicographer and story writer
Adarsh V Kurup, An NRI real estate manager from Vadasseril, Mararikulam, Cherthala working in the UAE.

See also 

 Kurup (film), Indian biographical film about Sukumara Kurup

Surnames of Indian origin